Campestane or 24R-methylcholestane is a tetracyclic triterpene. Its derivative campesterol (campest-5-en-3β-ol) was first isolated from the rapeseed (Brassica campestris), hence the name.

See also
 Cholestane
 Ergostane (24S-methylcholestane)
 Campestanol (Campestan-3β-ol)

References

Triterpenes